The 1980 United States Grand Prix West (officially the Toyota Grand Prix of Long Beach) was a Formula One motor race held on March 30, 1980, at Long Beach, California. It was the fourth round of the 1980 Formula One season. The race was the fifth United States Grand Prix West and the sixth street race to be held at Long Beach. The race was held over 80 laps of the 3.251-kilometre circuit for a total race distance of 260 kilometres.

The race was won by Brazilian driver Nelson Piquet driving a Brabham BT49. It was Piquet's debut World Championship victory in just his fourth points finish and announced his emergence as a championship contender. Piquet won by 49 seconds over Italian driver Riccardo Patrese driving an Arrows A3. It was the best result for both Arrows and Patrese in two years after Patrese finished second at the 1978 Swedish Grand Prix. Third was Brazilian driver, twice-World Champion Emerson Fittipaldi driving a Fittipaldi F7. It was Fittipaldi's best result since finishing second at the 1978 Brazilian Grand Prix.

Summary
Nelson Piquet took pole, fastest lap and his first career race win to dominate the weekend in his gleaming blue and white Brabham. The Brazilian's qualifying time was a full second ahead of the rest of the field, and he led all 80 laps of the race to win by 49 seconds and grab a share of the lead in the Drivers' Championship.

In Friday qualifying, Frenchman Didier Pironi recorded the fastest time, but getting a good lap on Saturday was a matter of using the soft qualifying tires at the right time and slotting in a good time before the track became too oily. Piquet was easily the fastest man on the circuit, using Goodyear tires, but Championship leader René Arnoux grabbed second place in his Renault with an early run on soft Michelins. The big surprise, however, was Jan Lammers, who put his ATS in fourth position while subbing for the injured Marc Surer. James Hunt nearly made a comeback with McLaren, asking for $1 million for the race. This opportunity came about when French rookie driver Alain Prost broke his wrist during practice for the South African Grand Prix, and was not fully fit to drive at Long Beach. The team's main sponsor, Marlboro, offered half the figure but negotiations ended after Hunt broke his leg while skiing. Stephen South substituted but South failed to qualify. Pironi slipped to ninth by the end of the session, while the Ferraris of Gilles Villeneuve and Jody Scheckter, so dominant here the year before, struggled to 10th and 16th, and Emerson Fittipaldi just managed to scramble onto the grid in the 24th and final spot. Americans Mario Andretti (Lotus) and Eddie Cheever (Osella), in his first full F1 season, were 15th and 19th.

The only mis-step of Piquet's weekend came in the Sunday morning warmup when he and Derek Daly collided entering the corner after the pits. The Brabham was vaulted into the air and landed heavily on all four tires, while Daly's Tyrrell went down the escape road. After careful examination, the Brabham crew decided that the car was fine and ready to race.

Entering the first corner Ricardo Zunino, Andretti, Jochen Mass and Jean-Pierre Jarier all made contact under braking. Zunino's Brabham and Andretti's Lotus were unable to continue. After one lap, Piquet led Patrick Depailler, who had gotten by René Arnoux in the hairpin. They were followed by Alan Jones, Bruno Giacomelli, Riccardo Patrese, Carlos Reutemann, Villeneuve and Daly.

On lap 4, Giacomelli lost control of his Alfa Romeo under braking for the hairpin at the beginning of Shoreline Drive, and slid sideways across the racing line. Reutemann, following directly behind, was the first to be collected. Jody Scheckter, Elio de Angelis, Cheever and Jarier also became involved. According to Reutemann, while Giacomelli's Alfa was facing the inside wall, he let a few cars pass, and then put his car in reverse, and backed onto the racing line, and Reutemann had to come to a dead stop to avoid hitting the Italian's Alfa, and then Giacomelli, realizing he had made a mistake, went back to where he was. By the time Giacomelli had realized what had happened, the 5 other aforementioned cars including Reutemann had created an accordion effect; although Reutemann and Scheckter, who had both stalled had not hit anything, de Angelis (who was injured), Cheever and Jarier had crashed, the latter most seriously; a wheel ripped off Jarier's Tyrrell and he went into the run-off area. The marshals decided to move forward Giacomelli and Cheever were able to continue for the time being, though both retired later in the race, and Reutemann had retired soon afterwards with gearbox problems. Fittipaldi just managed to squeeze through the carnage, and the marshals somehow got the track cleared before the leaders came around, avoiding a red flag to stop the race.

While Piquet continued to run unchallenged in front, Depailler was struggling with fading brakes on his Alfa Romeo. On lap 18, Jones caught and passed him on the outside of the hairpin to take second place. Meanwhile, Giacomelli was working his way back up through the field ahead of an extended battle between Regazzoni, Fittipaldi and John Watson. Gilles Villeneuve had managed to get the ill handling Ferrari into a good fourth place but his transmission failed on lap 46 and he was out of the race.

After pitting for tires on lap 47, Giacomelli rejoined in 12th place, just ahead of Jones, but about to be lapped by the Williams for the second time, and he continued his reckless on-track conduct. As Jones moved inside to pass the Italian entering the hairpin at the end of the straight, Giacomelli turned in and Jones struck the Alfa Romeo's rear wheel, bending the steering arm on the Williams and putting Jones out of the race. This left Piquet with a lead of more than a minute over Patrese and Arnoux, and he began to ease off, allowing some cars to unlap themselves.

Lap 50 saw a horrific accident which would ultimately end the career of Clay Regazzoni, the brakes on his Ensign N180 car failed on the long start finish straight, unable to reduce speed, he hit the stationary Brabham of Ricardo Zunino which had been left at the run off of the hairpin since lap 1, and then head on into a concrete wall. The accident left him paralyzed from the waist down. Regazzoni later sued the race organisers, but lost the case.

On lap 63, Arnoux had his right rear tire go completely flat, and by the time he was able to make it back to the pits for a replacement, he had dropped all the way to ninth place. Watson now began to challenge Fittipaldi for third, and even get around him briefly, but gearbox troubles allowed the Brazilian to retake the position and then pull away. Watson, in fact, came under fire from Scheckter's Ferrari. Braking into the hairpin, Scheckter tried to go around the outside, as Watson defended the inside line. He slid wide on the dirt and marbles, however, and thereafter, decided to settle for 5th place and his final points in Formula One.

For Piquet, it was the first of 23 career wins and pulled him even with Arnoux in the Drivers' Championship. For Fittipaldi, who finished third behind a steady Patrese in the Arrows, it was his first podium in more than two years, and the last of his F1 career (both as a driver and as a constructor). The torch was passed from one Brazilian multiple World Champion to another.

Classification

Qualifying

Race

Championship standings after the race

Drivers' Championship standings

Constructors' Championship standings

Note: Only the top five positions are included for both sets of standings.

References

Further reading
 Rob Walker (July, 1980). "5th United States Grand Prix West: Winner Takes All". Road & Track, 146–151.

United States Grand Prix West
United States Grand Prix West
United States Grand Prix West
United States Grand Prix West